James Salinsa Debbah (born 14 December 1969) is a Liberian professional football manager and former player who played as a forward. He was the manager of the Liberia national team from 2013 to 2017.

Club career 
Born in Monrovia, Debbah began his professional football career with the Liberian squad Mighty Barrolle in 1984. In 1989, he left Liberia for Union Douala ofeason. In 1990, Debbah moved 1991, Debbah moved up to the Ligue 1 squad Monaco and played the UEFA Cup Winners' Cup finals, then the year later he moved to Olympique Lyonnais. In 1995, moved across Ligue 1 to OGC Nice, where he played until 1997. In that year, Debbah moved to Belgian League side Anderlecht. He moved back to Ligue 1 for one season with Paris Saint-Germain in 1998. After leaving Paris Saint-Germain, Debbah moved to Süper Lig side Ankaragücü for the 1998 and 1999 seasons then to Greek side Iraklis. Debbah moved to Al-Jazeera Club in Abu Dhabi, United Arab Emirates, in 2001 and then to Muharraq Club in Muharraq, Bahrain, in 2003. In 2008, four years after leaving Muharraq Club, he moved to the Indonesia Super League with PKT Bontang for one season.

International career 
Debbah was part of both the 1996 and 2002 Liberian national football squads in the African Cup of Nations. During a July 2004 FIFA World Cup qualifying match against Togo in Monrovia, Debbah, as captain, refused to be substituted in the 53rd minute, instead waiting until the 68th minute to leave the pitch. The match resulted in a 0–0 draw, causing the team to leave the stadium under the protection of an armored personnel carrier.

He made a final appearance for the national team in September 2018, at the age of 48, making him the third oldest international player on record.

Personal life 
Debbah is the cousin of Liberian footballer George Weah.

Honours

Club
OGC Nice
 Coupe de France: 1997

References

Sources 
 Interview with James Salinsa Debbah LiberianSoccer.com
 James Debbah Zanziball.it
 James Debbah psg70.free.fr

1969 births
Living people
Sportspeople from Monrovia
Association football forwards
Liberian footballers
Liberian expatriate footballers
Liberia international footballers
Mighty Barrolle players
al-Muharraq SC players
Olympique Alès players
bontang F.C. players
AS Monaco FC players
Olympique Lyonnais players
OGC Nice players
R.S.C. Anderlecht players
Paris Saint-Germain F.C. players
MKE Ankaragücü footballers
Iraklis Thessaloniki F.C. players
Al Jazira Club players
Ligue 1 players
Belgian Pro League players
Süper Lig players
Super League Greece players
Expatriate footballers in Belgium
Expatriate footballers in Turkey
Expatriate footballers in Greece
Expatriate footballers in Indonesia
Expatriate footballers in France
Expatriate footballers in Monaco
Expatriate footballers in Bahrain
1996 African Cup of Nations players
2002 African Cup of Nations players
Liberian expatriate sportspeople in Monaco
UAE Pro League players